Bihar Mennonite Mandli is a Mennonite denomination of India. It has about 1500 members. It has 19 congregations.

Sources 

Mennonite denominations
Mennonitism in India